The Tenores di Bitti are a traditional folk music group from Bitti, Sardinia who employ a polyphonic vocal style, often described as a type of overtone singing, whose oral tradition dates back to 3000 BC.

The Tenores di Bitti are considered one of the best and most traditional groups in Sardinia. They extemporize or perform poems with each singer taking one of four parts: boke, bassu, contra, or mea'oke. Boke is the soloist and provides melody, bassu is the root and provides the tonic, contra provides the fifth, and mea'oke provides the octave above the fifth, filling out a chord in just intonation. There are in Bitti several "a tenore" groups and the most famous are Tenores di Bitti Mialinu Pira and Tenores di Bitti remunnu 'e Locu. Piero Sanna and Daniele Cossellu alternate boke and mesa 'oke on different songs while on all songs Tancredi Tucconi and Mario Pira take contra and bassu respectively.

Their album S'amore 'e mama includes the ambient noises of the various recording locations in Bitti including churches, streets, canteens, bars, countryside, and "nuraghe".

Recordings
 Tenores di Bitti Remunnu 'e Locu: S'amore 'e mama ["Mother's Love"]. Real World.
 Tenores di Bitti "Mialinu Pira": Su monte 'e mesus. RBS 1998

Sources

External links
 Didactic video about the voices of tenore 
 TenoresdiBitti.com, English
 TenoresBitti.com, English

Italian choirs
Throat singing
Music in Sardinia
Real World Records artists
Province of Nuoro

it:Tenores di Bitti "Mialinu Pira"